The Leyland Line was a British shipping transport line founded in 1873 by Frederick Richards Leyland after his apprenticeship in the firm of John Bibby, Sons & Co. After Frederick Leyland's death, the company was taken over by Sir John Ellerman in 1892. The Company was liquidated in 1935.

History

Early History
As the Company was established in 1873, 21 of the Bibby Line ships were transferred to the new company's maritime traffic of cargo ships before it added its passenger service on the Boston to Liverpool route. in 1888, Leyland retired from his active business leaving his son, Frederick Dawson Leyland, in charge of the line.

Under John Ellermann
With the death of Frederick Leyland in 1892, John Ellermann, Christopher Furness and Henry Withy took over the Leyland Line. Ellermann became managing director of the company and, in 1893, also took over the chairmanship of Frederick Leyland & Co. In 1896, Leyland set up a passenger service in co-operation with Furness Withy, from Liverpool to New York and the Canadian ports. In 1896, the Wilson Line was added and the joint service was called Wilson, Furness & Leyland Line.

Decline and Fate 
In 1902, the company was under the control of the International Mercantile Marine Company and, in the same year, a rationalisation of services followed and Leyland withdrew their ships from service and transferred to the Ellerman Lines. By the First World War and the 1920s, many ships of the Leyland Line transferred to other companies. With The Great Depression, many more ships were sold to other companies or scrapped and, in 1935, Leyland Line's last ship was sold and the company was ceased in the same year.

Ships of the Leyland Line
The list of Leyland Line ships when they enter service for the company.

Gallery

References

Shipping companies of the United Kingdom
1873 establishments in the United Kingdom
Defunct shipping companies of the United Kingdom
1873 establishments
Transatlantic shipping companies